A flute concerto is a concerto for solo flute and instrumental ensemble, customarily the orchestra. Such works have been written from the Baroque period, when the solo concerto form was first developed, up through the present day. Some major composers have contributed to the flute concerto repertoire, with the best known works including those by Mozart and Vivaldi.

Traditionally a three-movement work, the modern-day flute concerto has occasionally been structured in four or more movements. In some flute concertos, especially from the Baroque and modern eras, the flute is accompanied by a chamber ensemble rather than an orchestra.

Selected repertoire

Baroque

Michel Blavet
Concerto in A minor

Jean-Marie Leclair
Concerto in C major, Op. 7, No. 3 (also for violin or oboe solo)

Giovanni Battista Pergolesi
Flute Concerto in G major

Johann Joachim Quantz (1697–1773) – author of over 300 concertos for the flute.
Concerto in G major
Concerto in C minor

Georg Philipp Telemann
Concerto in F major

Antonio Vivaldi
 Concerto in F major for Flute (La Tempesta di Mare), RV 433 (Op. 10, No. 1), RV 98 and RV 570
 Concerto in G minor for Flute (La Notte), RV 439 (Op. 10, No. 2)
 Concerto in D major for Flute (Il Gardellino), RV 428 (Op. 10 No. 3)
 Concerto in G major for Flute, RV 435 (Op. 10, No. 4)
 Concerto in F major for Flute, RV 434 (Op. 10, No. 5)
 Concerto in G major for Flute, RV 437 (Op. 10, No. 6)
 Concerto in A minor for Flute, RV 440
 Concerto in D major for Flute, RV 429
 Concerto in C major for 2 Flutes, RV 533

Classical

C.P.E. Bach (1714–1788)
Flute Concerto in D major
Flute Concerto in G major H.445 (Wq.169)
Flute Concerto in D minor H.426
Flute Concerto in A major H.438 (Wq.168)
Flute concerto in A minor Wq.166
Flute concerto in B flat major Wq 167

Franz Benda (1709–1786)
Concerto in G minor
Concerto in A minor

Domenico Cimarosa
 Concerto for Two Flutes in G Major (1783)

Franz Danzi
 Concerto No. 1 in G major
 Concerto No. 2 in D minor
 Concerto No. 3 in D minor
 Concerto No. 4 in D major

François Devienne
Concerto No. 2 in D major
Concerto No. 3 in G major
Concerto No. 7 in E minor
Concerto No. 10 in D major

Frederick the Great (1712–1786)
4 concertos for flute and strings

Christoph Willibald Gluck
Concerto in G major

Joseph Haydn
Flute Concerto in D major (lost)

Leopold Hofmann
Flute Concerto in D major (previously attributed to Haydn)

Franz Anton Hoffmeister
 Flute Concerto D major

Franz Krommer
 Flute Concerto Op.86

Franz Lachner
Flute Concerto in D minor

Bernhard Molique
 Concerto in D minor for Flute and Orchestra

Leopold Mozart
Flute Concerto in G major

Wolfgang Amadeus Mozart
Concerto for Flute and Harp
Flute Concerto No. 1
Flute Concerto No. 2 – originally written as an Oboe Concerto but now also firmly part of the flute repertoire.

Josef Reicha
 Concerto for Flute and Orchestra (1781)

Andreas Romberg
 Flute Concerto

Antonio Rosetti
 Flute Concerto in G major
 Flute Concerto in C major
 Flute Concerto in F major

František Xaver Pokorný
Flute Concerto in D Major (Boccherini, Op. 27)

Antonio Salieri
Concerto for Flute, Oboe and Orchestra (1774)
Concertino da camera for Flute and Strings (1777)

Carl Stamitz
Concerto in G major

Peter Winter
Flute Concerto No. 1 in D minor
Flute Concerto No. 2 in D minor

Romantic

Peter Benoit
Flute Concerto (Symphonic Tale)

François Borne
Carmen Fantasie Brillante

Ferdinand Büchner
Flute Concerto in F minor

Cécile Chaminade
Flute Concertino in D major, Op. 107

Franz Doppler
Concerto in D minor for two flutes and orchestra

François-Joseph Fétis
Flute Concerto in B minor

Saverio Mercadante
Concerto in D major
Concerto in E major
Concerto in E minor
Concerto in F major (2 movements)

Carl Reinecke
 Concerto in D major, Op. 283 (1908)

Carl Gottlieb Reissiger
Concertino in D major for Flute and Orchestra

Bernhard Romberg
Concerto in B minor 0202 2000 Strings

Modern

Samuel Adler
 Concerto for Flute and Orchestra (1977)

Kalevi Aho
 Flute Concerto

Robert Aitken
 Concerto for Flute and String Orchestra (Shadows V). (1999)

Sir Malcolm Arnold
 Concerto for Flute and Strings
 Flute Concerto No. 2

Aaron Avshalomov
Flute Concerto

Leonardo Balada
Flute Concerto (2000)

Flint Juventino Beppe
 Flute Mystery Op.66 a/b (Alto flute / C flute)
 Flute Concerto No.1 Op.70
 Flute Concerto No.2 Op.80

Leonard Bernstein
 Ḥalil, nocturne for flute, percussion, and strings

Rutland Boughton
 Concerto for Flute and Strings

Pierre Boulez
 ...explosante-fixe..., for MIDI-flute, chamber orchestra and electronics (1972–1993)

Henry Brant
 Concerto for flute solo with flute orchestra Ghosts & Gargoyles (2002)

John Carmichael
 Concerto for Flute and Orchestra: Phoenix Concerto 2222–4331 perc, harp, string, timpani

Elliott Carter
Flute Concerto (2008)

John Corigliano
 Concerto for Flute and Orchestra: Pied Piper Fantasy

Marc-André Dalbavie
 Flute Concerto (2006)

Michael Daugherty
 Flute Concerto  Trail Of Tears  (2010)

Edison Denisov
 Flute Concerto (1975)

Pascal Dusapin
 Concerto for flute and string orchestra Galim (1998)

Eric Ewazen
Concerto for Flute and Chamber Orchestra

Jindřich Feld
 Flute Concerto (1954)

Morton Feldman
 Flute and Orchestra (1978)

Arthur Foote
 Nocturne and Scherzo for Flute and String Orchestra

Lukas Foss
 Renaissance Concerto (1985) for Flute and Orchestra

Jean Françaix
 Double Concerto for Flute, Clarinet and Orchestra
 Flute Concerto (1967)

Harald Genzmer
Flute Concerto

Geoffrey Gordon
 Concerto for Flute and Orchestra (2012)

Sofia Gubaidulina
The Deceitful Face of Hope and Despair – Flute Concerto
Music for Flute, Strings, and Percussion – Flute Concerto

Otar Gordeli
 Concerto for Flute and Orchestra, Op. 8

Charles T. Griffes
 Poem for Flute and Orchestra (1918)

Jorge Grundman
 Concerto for Flute and String Orchestra. On the Back of a Nightingale, Op. 31 (2012)
 Slow Concerto for Flute and String Orchestra. A Promise to Frida, Op. 84 (2021)

Howard Hanson
 Serenade for Solo Flute, Harp and String Orchestra

Chris Harman
 Concerto for flute and orchestra, Catacombs (1999–2000)

Jacques Hétu
 Concerto pour flûte

Vagn Holmboe
Flute Concerto No. 1 (1975–6)
Flute Concerto No. 2 (1981–2)

Alan Hovhaness
Symphony no 36, Op. 312 for Flute and Orchestra (1978)

Jacques Ibert
 Flute Concerto (1934)

Andrew Imbrie
 Concerto for Flute and Orchestra (1977)

Gordon Jacob
Concerto for Flute and String Orchestra op.1
Concerto for Flute and String Orchestra op.2

André Jolivet
 Concerto (1949)

Giya Kancheli
 Ninna Nanna Per Anna (2008), for solo flute & strings

Aaron Jay Kernis
Flute Concerto (2015)

Peter Paul Koprowski
Flute Concerto

Aram Khachaturian
 Concerto for Flute and Orchestra – an arrangement of his Violin Concerto in D minor

Sophie Lacaze
 Het Lam Gods II, for solo flute and flute orchestra (2007)
 Les quatre elements, concerto for flute, children choir and percussions (2005)
 And then there was the sun in the sky, concerto for flute, digeridoo and flute orchestra (2000)

Lowell Liebermann
 Concerto for Flute and Orchestra Op.39 (1992)
 Concerto for Flute, Harp and Orchestra Op.48 (1995)

György Ligeti
 Double Concerto, for flute, oboe and orchestra

Jeff Manookian
Concerto for Flute and Orchestra

Peter Mennin
 Concertino for Flute, Strings and Percussion (1945)
 Concerto for Flute and Orchestra (1983)

Olivier Messiaen
Concert à quatre ("Quadruple concerto"), for piano, flute, oboe, cello and orchestra (1990–91)

Þorkell Sigurbjörnsson
 Liongate for Flute and Orchestra

Carl Nielsen
 Flute Concerto (1926)

Krzysztof Penderecki
 Flute Concerto (1992)

William P. Perry
 Summer Nocturne for Flute and Orchestra (1988)

Walter Piston
 Concerto for Flute and Orchestra (1971)

Yves Prin
Le Souffle d'Iris (1986)

Behzad Ranjbaran
 Concerto for Flute and Orchestra (2013)

Einojuhani Rautavaara
 Flute Concerto Dances with the Winds

Jean Rivier
 Flute Concerto

Joaquín Rodrigo
 Concierto pastoral, for flute and orchestra (1978)

Ned Rorem
 Flute Concerto (2002)

Christopher Rouse
 Flute Concerto (1993)

Kaija Saariaho
 Flute Concerto Aile du songe (2001)

Aulis Sallinen
 Flute Concerto Harlekiini, Op. 70 (1995)

R. Murray Schafer
 Flute Concerto (1984)

Ole Schmidt
 Concerto for Flute and Strings

Laura Schwendinger
Waking Dream for Flute and Orchestra (2009)

Eric Sessler
 Flute Concerto (2011)

Judith Shatin
 Ruah (1987)

Alexander Shchetynsky
 Flute Concerto (1993)

Emil Tabakov
 Concerto for 2 Flutes (2003)

Tōru Takemitsu
 Toward the Sea II, for alto flute, harp, and string orchestra

Josef Tal
 Concerto for Flute & Chamber Orchestra (1976)

Joan Tower
 Flute Concerto (1989)

Melinda Wagner
 Concerto for Flute, Strings, and Percussion (Pulitzer Prize winner 1999)

Mieczysław Weinberg
Flute Concerto No. 1, op. 75 (1961)
Flute Concerto No. 2, op. 148 (1987)

Huw Watkins
Flute Concerto

Herbert Willi
Flute Concerto

John Williams
Concerto for Flute and Orchestra (1969)

Charles Wuorinen
Chamber Concerto for Flute and 10 Players

Isang Yun
Flute Concerto

Ellen Taaffe Zwilich
 Concerto for Flute and Orchestra (1989)
 Concerto Elegia for Flute and Strings (2015)